South Carolina Highway 269 (SC 269) is a  state highway in the U.S. state of South Carolina. The highway travels through rural areas of Richland and Fairfield counties.

Route description
SC 269 begins at an intersection with SC 215 (Monticello Road) near Blythewood, Richland County. It travels to the north and curves to the north-northwest and enters Fairfield County. It curves to the north-northeast and the northeast and passes the Fairfield County Airport. A short distance later, it meets its northern terminus, an intersection with U.S. Route 321 (US 321) at a point south of Winnsboro Mills.

Major intersections

See also

References

External links

SC 269 at Virginia Highways' South Carolina Highways Annex

269
Transportation in Richland County, South Carolina
Transportation in Fairfield County, South Carolina